The Shipping Association of Barbados (SAB) is the national shipping institution of Barbados with its headquarters in Bridgetown. Formed in January 1981, the association consists primarily of ship members and stevedore companies who meet on a monthly basis. SAB is a wider member of the Caribbean Shipping Association (CSA).

See also
Deep Water Harbour

References

Companies based in Bridgetown
Transport organisations based in Barbados
Barbados
Water transport in Barbados
Organizations established in 1981
1981 establishments in Barbados